Chakra Goth  is a neighbourhood in the Korangi District in eastern Karachi, Pakistan. It was previously part of Korangi Town, which was an administrative unit that was disbanded in 2011.

There are several ethnic groups in Chakra Goth including Muhajirs, Punjabis, Sindhis, Kashmiris, Seraikis, Pakhtuns, Balochis, Bengalis, Memons, Bohras, Ismailis, Rohingyas, etc. The population is predominantly Muslim. There are large number of Bengalis from Bangladesh, and Rohingyas from Myanmar have settled in this neighbourhood.

The neighborhood has been gang fighting in which 3 Sindh Reserve Police officers were killed.

See also 
 Ittehad Colony
 Bengalis in Pakistan
 Burmese people in Pakistan

References

External links 
 Karachi Website

Neighbourhoods of Karachi
Korangi Town

80% population of sindhis